Emre Toraman (born 5 January 1979) is a retired Turkish football player.

Career
On 31 August 2016, he joined Bucaspor on a one-year contract.

Honours

Club
Trabzonspor
Turkish Cup: 2003–04

References

External links
 
 
 

1979 births
Living people
Turkish footballers
Turkey international footballers
Gençlerbirliği S.K. footballers
Trabzonspor footballers
Kayseri Erciyesspor footballers
Çaykur Rizespor footballers
Eskişehirspor footballers
Kasımpaşa S.K. footballers
Konyaspor footballers
Boluspor footballers
Elazığspor footballers
Süper Lig players
Association football midfielders